Yermolino is the name of several inhabited localities in Russia:

Modern localities

Ivanovo Oblast
As of 2012, one rural locality in Ivanovo Oblast bears this name:
Yermolino, Ivanovo Oblast, a selo in Furmanovsky District

Kaluga Oblast
As of 2012, one urban locality in Kaluga Oblast bears this name:
Yermolino, Kaluga Oblast, a town in Borovsky District

Kostroma Oblast
As of 2012, two rural localities in Kostroma Oblast bear this name:
Yermolino, Antropovsky District, Kostroma Oblast, a village in Prosekskoye Settlement of Antropovsky District; 
Yermolino, Buysky District, Kostroma Oblast, a village in Tsentralnoye Settlement of Buysky District;

Leningrad Oblast
As of 2012, one rural locality in Leningrad Oblast bears this name:
Yermolino, Leningrad Oblast, a village in Yelizavetinskoye Settlement Municipal Formation of Gatchinsky District;

Moscow Oblast
As of 2012, five rural localities in Moscow Oblast bear this name:
Yermolino, Dmitrovsky District, Moscow Oblast, a village under the administrative jurisdiction of Iksha Work Settlement in Dmitrovsky District
Yermolino, Istrinsky District, Moscow Oblast, a village in Yermolinskoye Rural Settlement of Istrinsky District
Yermolino, Leninsky District, Moscow Oblast, a selo under the administrative jurisdiction of the Town of Vidnoye in Leninsky District
Yermolino, Solnechnogorsky District, Moscow Oblast, a village in Krivtsovskoye Rural Settlement of Solnechnogorsky District
Yermolino, Taldomsky District, Moscow Oblast, a village in Yermolinskoye Rural Settlement of Taldomsky District

Nizhny Novgorod Oblast
As of 2012, two rural localities in Nizhny Novgorod Oblast bear this name:
Yermolino, Lyskovsky District, Nizhny Novgorod Oblast, a selo in Kirikovsky Selsoviet of Lyskovsky District
Yermolino, Sharangsky District, Nizhny Novgorod Oblast, a village in Rozhentsovsky Selsoviet of Sharangsky District

Novgorod Oblast
As of 2012, two rural localities in Novgorod Oblast bear this name:
Yermolino, Novgorodsky District, Novgorod Oblast, a village in Yermolinskoye Settlement of Novgorodsky District
Yermolino, Okulovsky District, Novgorod Oblast, a village in Borovenkovskoye Settlement of Okulovsky District

Omsk Oblast
As of 2012, one rural locality in Omsk Oblast bears this name:
Yermolino, Omsk Oblast, a village in Troitsky Rural Okrug of Tyukalinsky District

Perm Krai
As of 2012, one rural locality in Perm Krai bears this name:
Yermolino, Perm Krai, a village in Beryozovsky District

Pskov Oblast
As of 2012, one rural locality in Pskov Oblast bears this name:
Yermolino, Pskov Oblast, a village in Bezhanitsky District

Smolensk Oblast
As of 2012, one rural locality in Smolensk Oblast bears this name:
Yermolino, Smolensk Oblast, a village in Roslavlskoye Rural Settlement of Roslavlsky District

Tver Oblast
As of 2012, two rural localities in Tver Oblast bear this name:
Yermolino, Firovsky District, Tver Oblast, a village in Rozhdestvenskoye Rural Settlement of Firovsky District
Yermolino, Maksatikhinsky District, Tver Oblast, a village in Truzhenitskoye Rural Settlement of Maksatikhinsky District

Vladimir Oblast
As of 2012, one rural locality in Vladimir Oblast bears this name:
Yermolino, Vladimir Oblast, a village in Petushinsky District

Vologda Oblast
As of 2012, four rural localities in Vologda Oblast bear this name:
Yermolino, Chagodoshchensky District, Vologda Oblast, a village in Lukinsky Selsoviet of Chagodoshchensky District
Yermolino, Gryazovetsky District, Vologda Oblast, a village in Rostilovsky Selsoviet of Gryazovetsky District
Yermolino, Ust-Kubinsky District, Vologda Oblast, a village in Bogorodsky Selsoviet of Ust-Kubinsky District
Yermolino, Vologodsky District, Vologda Oblast, a village in Kubensky Selsoviet of Vologodsky District

Yaroslavl Oblast
As of 2012, four rural localities in Yaroslavl Oblast bear this name:
Yermolino, Borisoglebsky District, Yaroslavl Oblast, a village in Andreyevsky Rural Okrug of Borisoglebsky District
Yermolino, Lyubimsky District, Yaroslavl Oblast, a village in Kirillovsky Rural Okrug of Lyubimsky District
Yermolino, Pereslavsky District, Yaroslavl Oblast, a village in Perelessky Rural Okrug of Pereslavsky District
Yermolino, Rybinsky District, Yaroslavl Oblast, a village in Nazarovsky Rural Okrug of Rybinsky District

Abolished localities
Yermolino, Parfenyevsky District, Kostroma Oblast, a village in Potrusovsky Selsoviet of Parfenyevsky District in Kostroma Oblast; abolished on October 18, 2004

References

Notes

Sources